Courbeveille is a commune in the Mayenne department in north-western France. It is around 12 km south-west of Laval.

See also
Communes of the Mayenne department

References

Communes of Mayenne